Kathana is a large village in Anand district in the Indian state of Gujarat.

Demographics
 India census, Kathana had a population of 11,882. Males constitute 52.68% of the population and females 47.32%. Kathana has an average literacy rate of 81.64%: male literacy is 92.75%, and female literacy is 69.34%. In Kathana, 13.88% of the population is under 6 years of age.

Transport

Railway
Kathana railway station is located on the Western Railway Ahmedabad – Vadodara Segment. It is 43 km from Vasad, 62 km from Vadodara.

References

Villages in Anand district